Calybe is a genus of beetles in the family Carabidae, containing the following species:

 Calybe aequatoria (Chaudoir, 1850) 
 Calybe amazonica Chaudoir, 1872 
 Calybe anthicoides Solier, 1836 
 Calybe argentina Brether, 1916 
 Calybe basalis Bates, 1871 
 Calybe belti Bates, 1878 
 Calybe biloba (Bates, 1871) 
 Calybe brasiliensis Motschulsky, 1864 
 Calybe delicatula Motschulsky, 1864 
 Calybe formicaria (Laporte De Castelnau, 1834) 
 Calybe fuscoaenea Motschulsky, 1864 
 Calybe grata (Motschulsky, 1864) 
 Calybe inaequalis Brulle, 1838 
 Calybe laetula (Leconte, 1851) 
 Calybe leprieuri Laporte De Castelnau, 1834 
 Calybe leucopus Bates, 1871 
 Calybe longiceps Schaum, 1863 
 Calybe magna Liebke, 1939 
 Calybe montevidensis Tremoleras, 1917 
 Calybe nodicollis (Bates, 1871) 
 Calybe obliqua Chaudoir, 1872 
 Calybe sallei (Chevrolat, 1839) 
 Calybe sulcipennis Chaudoir, 1872 
 Calybe tenuicollis (Dejean, 1831)
 Calybe tumidula Bates, 1871

References

Lebiinae
Carabidae genera